Pyebank F.C. was an English association football club based in Sheffield, South Yorkshire.

History
Little is known of the club other than that it competed in the FA Cup in 1899. Billy Betts, the famous Sheffield Wednesday and England player, started his career with Pyebank.

Records
Best FA Cup performance: Preliminary Round, 1899-1900

References

Defunct football clubs in England
Defunct football clubs in South Yorkshire
Sheffield Association League